Sport Lisboa e Benfica is a Portuguese professional football team based in São Domingos de Benfica, Lisbon. The club was formed in 1904 and played its first competitive match on 4 November 1906, when it entered the inaugural edition of the Campeonato de Lisboa. They won their first regional title in 1910, and their first nationwide in 1930, the Campeonato de Portugal, a knockout competition which determined the Portuguese champion among the winners of the regional championships. In 1934, an experimental league competition known as Primeira Liga was introduced in Portuguese football. Due to its success among the clubs, it became the official top-tier championship in 1938, in place of the Campeonato de Portugal. Since its first edition, Benfica have won a record 37 titles. Internationally, they won the European Cup twice, in 1961 and 1962.

Since their first competitive match, more than 750 players have made a competitive first-team appearance for the club, many of whom have played between 25 and 99 matches. Dimas, Tahar El Khalej, and Nemanja Matić all fell one short of 100 appearances, as they all moved elsewhere while the season was ongoing. Four former players went on to be first-team managers: Cosme Damião, Ribeiro dos Reis, Vítor Gonçalves, and Cândido Tavares. Hugo Leal, who appeared 41 times for the club, is the youngest player to have played for Benfica. He was 16 years and 335 days when he played against Sporting de Espinho on 20 April 1997. João Félix holds the club record sale at €126 million. Nemanja Matić and Darwin Núñez are the only players listed to have been selected as Primeira Liga Player of the Year. Of the players still at the club, Chiquinho is the closest to 100 appearances; he has played 98 matches.

As of 18 March 2023, a total of 275 players have played between 25 and 99 competitive matches for the club. Of those players, 12 are still playing for the club.

Key
The list is ordered by date of debut.
Appearances as a substitute are included.
Statistics are correct up to and including the match played on 18 March 2023. Where a player left the club permanently after this date, his statistics are updated to his date of leaving.

List of players (25 to 99 appearances)

Footnotes

Player statistics include games played while on loan from:

References
General
 
 

Specific

S.L. Benfica
Pl
S.L. Benfica
Association football player non-biographical articles